Same-sex marriage in Alberta has been legal since July 20, 2005 upon the granting of royal assent to the federal Civil Marriage Act. Alberta was one of the four Canadian provinces and territories where same-sex marriage had not been legalised prior to the enactment of the Civil Marriage Act, along with Prince Edward Island, the Northwest Territories and Nunavut.

Adult interdependent relationship

Since 2003, same-sex couples have had access to adult interdependent relationships, providing some of the rights and benefits of marriage. This includes alimony, health care benefits, inheritance, domestic violence protection, etc.

Civil Marriage Act
On June 28, 2005, the House of Commons of Canada passed the Civil Marriage Act, an act which defines Canadian civil marriage as a union between "two persons". The bill received royal assent by Deputy Governor General Beverley McLachlin a few weeks later and went into effect on July 20, 2005. Premier Ralph Klein responded by saying that the Alberta Government might opt to stop solemnizing marriages entirely, suggesting that in its place, the government would issue civil union licences to both opposite-sex and same-sex couples. Religious groups could still solemnize opposite-sex unions as marriages if they chose, but any civil ceremony would be permitted to recognize only a civil union. The Alberta Government also considered continuing to issue marriage licences to opposite-sex couples only in court, on the grounds that the Federal Government's legislation encroached on the Provincial Government's jurisdiction over the solemnization of marriage. In December 2004, Klein had suggested conducting a nationwide referendum on the legalisation of same-sex marriage, but this was opposed by Prime Minister Paul Martin, saying that "that this is an issue that Parliamentarians ought to decide". Klein stated "In this province, my feeling is the majority -- and I don't know what the percentage of the majority is -- but the majority of people are opposed to same-sex marriage. And I represent the people of this province."

On July 12, 2005, Klein conceded that the advice given to him by legal experts was that a challenge in court to refuse to marry same-sex couples had no chance, and wasting taxpayers' money to fight it would be "giving false hope." Klein said, "much to our chagrin", the Alberta Government would issue marriage licences to same-sex couples when the bill received royal assent. Klein also said that the Alberta Government would enact provincial legislation to protect religious and civil officials who do not wish to perform a same-sex marriage. This would have meant that an Alberta marriage commissioner who refused to solemnize same-sex marriages would not be liable for dismissal on those grounds. However, no such legislation was passed, indicative of the "sea change" in attitudes towards same-sex marriage in Alberta. This mirrored similar developments in the neighbouring province of Saskatchewan where courts have twice struck down attempts to exempt marriage commissioners from performing same-sex weddings.

The first same-sex couple to receive a marriage licence in Alberta were Keenan Carley and Robert Bradford in Edmonton just hours after the Act received royal assent on July 20. The couple had to wait until provincial officials instructed all registry offices to issue marriage licenses to same-sex couples, and the licence forms were changed from stating "Bride" and "Groom" to "Partner 1" and "Partner 2". The couple said, "It's wonderful feeling to know that it can finally be official. [...] It means that when we do have that ceremony, it will be legal, that we will be recognized as a married couple by the province of Alberta and the government of Canada. And that's a great thing."

Provincial legislation

Marriage Act
The position of Premier Ralph Klein and the Progressive Conservative government had been to attempt to block same-sex marriages in Alberta should a court case require it or federal legislation pass it nationwide. On March 16, 2000, the Legislative Assembly of Alberta passed Bill 202 which amended the provincial Marriage Act to include a heterosexual-only definition of marriage. The bill also invoked the Notwithstanding Clause of the Canadian Charter of Rights and Freedoms. This insulated the Marriage Act from any legal challenge based on violation of Charter rights, including the Section 15 equality guarantees. Under the terms of the Notwithstanding Clause, such a declaration is effective for only five years after it comes into force. For the Marriage Act, this period expired on March 23, 2005. Premier Klein sent mixed messages about whether it would be renewed; ultimately, it was not. The Minister of Government Services, Ty Lund, tabled a report at the conservative caucus on April 4, 2005, stating that the Federal Government, not the provinces, has the exclusive jurisdiction to define marriage. The report further stated that if Alberta renewed the declaration in the Act by using the Notwithstanding Clause, the "government would be needlessly wasting time and money".

While the act could not have been challenged under the Charter, the definition of marriage is outside the power of the Provincial Government, or ultra vires, and therefore invalid. The Constitution Act, 1867 is universally interpreted as giving provinces jurisdiction over only the solemnization of marriage, while all other aspects, including capacity to marry, are under federal jurisdiction. At the time Bill 202 was passed, Justice Minister Dave Hancock did not support it, saying: "In terms of legal effect, I'm convinced it doesn't have any." Hancock subsequently stated that he believed the act to be constitutionally valid and that Alberta would attempt to uphold it. Following the December 9, 2004 Supreme Court response to the federal reference of same-sex marriage, Hancock's successor, Ron Stevens, conceded that the Bill 202 amendments to the Marriage Act would likely be struck down as unconstitutional on account of its encroachment into what had by then been explicitly ruled a matter of federal jurisdiction. In December 2004, Canadians for Equal Marriage said they were considering filing a court challenge to legalise same-sex marriage in Alberta, similar to what had happened in other provinces and territories, "The essence of the challenge is going to be discrimination based on sexual orientation. They suggest marriage continues to be between a man and a woman, when the Supreme Court and other jurisdictions have stated very clearly otherwise." Michael Phair, a member of the Edmonton City Council, said "We are tired of being bullied. It is an outrage, and it is nothing but bias and revenge to force us to go to the courts to get what everyone else has in this country."

In May 2014, the Legislative Assembly amended the Marriage Act to remove the Bill 202 amendments added in 2000, to replace references to "husband and wife" with the gender-neutral term "spouses" and to add "or spouse" in section 8(2), nine years after same-sex marriage became legal in Alberta. Several other acts were amended in a similar way. The legislation received royal assent by Lieutenant Governor Donald Ethell on 14 May. Section 8 of the Act states that each of the parties shall, in the presence of the marriage commissioner and the witnesses, declare:

Adoption Act
Same-sex couples have been allowed to adopt their stepchildren since 1999. In February 2007, same-sex couples won the right to adopt children jointly.

Two-spirit marriages
Many First Nations have traditions of two-spirit individuals who were born male but wore women's clothing and performed everyday household work and artistic handiwork which were regarded as belonging to the feminine sphere. Among the Plains Cree people, two-spirit individuals were regarded as "esteemed persons with special spiritual powers" and were "noted shamans". It was likely that they were able to marry cisgender men, though David G. Mandelbaum reported in 1940 that an iyîhkwêw named Clawed Woman had remained unmarried her entire life. They carried out only women's work and would marry men. This two-spirit status thus allowed for marriages between two biological males to be performed among these peoples.

Marriage statistics
2,485 same-sex couples married in Alberta from 2005 to 2014. The 2016 Canadian census showed that there were 6,110 same-sex couples living in Alberta.

Religious performance
In July 2019, the synod of the Anglican Church of Canada passed a resolution known as "A Word to the Church", allowing its dioceses to choose whether to perform same-sex marriages. A few days after the vote, Bishop Jane Alexander of the Anglican Diocese of Edmonton issued a pastoral letter authorising clergy in the diocese to officiate at same-sex marriages. The measure includes a freedom of conscience clause for clergy opposed to performing the marriages. The Anglican Diocese of Calgary does not perform same-sex marriages. In October 2017, the diocesan synod voted with a 57.4% majority to request Bishop Greg Kerr-Wilson to permit parishes to bless civil same-sex marriages. The Diocese of Athabasca, encompassing northern Alberta, likewise does not perform same-sex marriages.

Public opinion
An EKOS/CBC poll in 2002 indicated that attitudes towards same-sex marriage were more supportive in Alberta than they were in the provinces of Manitoba and Saskatchewan, both of which had recognized same-sex marriage earlier. A June 2003 survey by Ipsos-Reid, conducted a few weeks after same-sex marriage was legalized in Ontario, showed that 57% of Albertans opposed same-sex marriage, while 41% supported it. Opposition was higher among older people (77%) than middle-aged people (60%) and younger people (41%), higher among men (63%) than women (51%), and higher among people living in rural areas (65%) than people living in urban areas (45%). An Ipsos-Reid poll conducted in August 2005 showed that 56% of Albertans remained opposed to same-sex marriage.

An October 2011 poll conducted by the Citizen Society Research Lab at Lethbridge College found that 72.1% of Albertans supported same-sex marriage, while 27.9% were opposed, a big change in comparison to 2005 when a majority of residents opposed it.

See also
Same-sex marriage in Canada
LGBT rights in Canada

References

External links
 
 

Alberta
Politics of Alberta
Alberta law
LGBT in Alberta
2005 in LGBT history